Anna Makarova (born 2 April 1984) is a Ukrainian and Russian female former volleyball player, playing as an opposite. She was part of the Russia women's national volleyball team.

She competed at the 2009 Women's European Volleyball Championship. At club level she played for VK Samorodok in 2009.

References

External links
 
 russiavolley.com 

1984 births
Living people
Ukrainian women's volleyball players
Russian women's volleyball players
Place of birth missing (living people)